Nicola Ugolino (fl. 1720s) was an Italian lute player and composer. He was a musician in the Real Cappella, and recorded as a "street musician in the cemetery"."

References

18th-century Italian composers
18th-century Italian male musicians
Italian Baroque composers
Italian male classical composers
Italian lutenists